Roberto Heinze Flamand (born March 16, 1972) is a Mexican sprint canoer who competed in the early to mid-1990s. At the 1992 Summer Olympics in Barcelona, he was eliminated in the repechages of the K-1 500 m event. Four years later in Atlanta, Flamand was eliminated in the repechages of the K-2 500 m event.

References
Sports-Reference.com profile

1972 births
Canoeists at the 1992 Summer Olympics
Canoeists at the 1996 Summer Olympics
Living people
Mexican male canoeists
Olympic canoeists of Mexico
Mexican people of German descent
Mexican people of French descent